Komic (also spelled as Komik) is a small village located in Spiti Tehsil of Lahaul and Spiti district of Himachal Pradesh with population of 130 of out of which 90 males and 40 are females as per Population Census 2011.

Komic village is often and incorrectly claimed as the world’s highest motorable village,  including claims of 18000 feet   (ie. higher than Everest Base Camp )   Signposts in the village claims 4587 meters , which would possibly place it higher than Korzok , listed as highest settlement in India , but five hundred meters below the mining town La_Rinconada,_Peru .

Pupulation

Tourism 
Komic village is tourist attraction for 500 years old "Lundup Tsemo Gompa Buddhist Monastery", and for one of the world’s highest village.

References 

Villages in Lahaul and Spiti district
Villages in Himachal Pradesh